Storm Fear is a 1955 American film noir directed by Cornel Wilde, starring himself, Jean Wallace and Dan Duryea. It was Wilde's feature directorial debut.

Plot
After being badly wounded during a heist, bank robber Charlie Blake (Wilde) takes refuge in a remote New England farm house owned by his older brother Fred (Duryea), who lives there with wife Elizabeth and young son David. A weak and unhappy man, Fred reluctantly harbors the fugitive and his gang members, the brutal Benjie and their moll Edna.

Time passes and Charlie's men are anxious to move on, but he needs rest to recover. He is also still in love with Fred's wife Elizabeth (Wallace), with whom he once had an affair. Elizabeth's hired hand Hank is in love with her as well. Fred must endure both situations, plus the taunting and physical abuse of Benjie.

More trouble ensues when suspicions arise that Elizabeth's son was fathered by Charlie, not her husband. A heavy snow and his bullet wound delay Charlie's escape, but when Fred sneaks away to contact the police, David guides the gang members through the snowy terrain. Elizabeth is tied up and left behind.

Edna breaks a leg in a fall and Charlie cruelly abandons her in the wilderness. Hank comes across Fred's frozen corpse. An argument breaks out between Charlie and Benjie along the way, resulting in David picking up a gun and killing Benjie with it. Charlie now has the robbery loot to himself, but Hank turns up and shoots him. Charlie dies without acknowledging for the boy whether he is his real father.

Cast
 Cornel Wilde as Charlie Blake
 Jean Wallace as Elizabeth Blake 
 Dan Duryea as Fred Blake 
 Lee Grant as Edna Rogers 
 David Stollery as David Blake 
 Dennis Weaver as Hank 
 Steven Hill as Benjie

Production
The film was based on a novel by Clinton Seeley which was published in November 1954. The New York Times called it "a pleasant discovery... a tale of terror presented with economy, insight and a surprising amount of technical skill." It was told through the first person of a 12 year old, Davie.

Cornel Wilde bought the film rights in December 1954.

Wilde had recently moved into producing, establishing his own company, Theodora, with his then-wife Jean Wallace. Their first film was The Big Combo. In January 1955 he hired Horton Foote to write the script, and announced he wanted this to be Theodora's second film, putting others (Curly, Lord Byron, Second Act Curtain) on the back burner.

Wilde, who had recently directed an episode of General Electric Theatre, decided to direct this.

Steven Hill, a highly regarded Broadway actor, was cast in the film.

Filming was meant to start April 15 in Sun Valley but Wilde found the date had to be brought forward to April 5 to get the snow topped mountains he wanted."I wasn't able to do the pre-camera rehearsals I had planned but everything worked out", said Wilde. "The weather was a big problem and we had to adjust our schedules to it, jumping from scenes requiring bright sunlight to moody stuff as the sun played hide and seek with the clouds."

See also
List of American films of 1955

References

External links
 
 
 
 

1955 films
1955 crime films
American black-and-white films
American crime films
Film noir
Films about bank robbery
Films based on American novels
Films directed by Cornel Wilde
Films scored by Elmer Bernstein
Films set in New England
Films shot in Idaho
Films with screenplays by Horton Foote
United Artists films
1955 directorial debut films
1950s English-language films
1950s American films